Vice Chief of the General Staff (VCGS) was the title of the deputy to the Chief of the General Staff, the  professional head of the British Army. From 1940 until 1985 the Vice Chief was the second-ranking member of the General Staff and was a member of the Army Board.

List of post-holders
The Vice Chiefs were as follows:

Vice Chief of the Imperial General Staff
 Lieutenant-General Sir John Dill April 1940 – 27 May 1940
 Lieutenant-General Sir Robert Haining 27 May 1940 – 19 May 1941
 Lieutenant-General Sir Henry Pownall 19 May 1941 – 5 December 1941
 Lieutenant-General Sir Archibald Nye 5 December 1941 – 1945
 Lieutenant-General Sir Frank Simpson 1946–1948
 Lieutenant-General Sir Gerald Templer 1948–1950
 Lieutenant-General Sir Nevil Brownjohn 1950–1952
 Lieutenant-General Sir Harold Redman 1952–1955
 Lieutenant-General Sir William Oliver 1955–1957
 Lieutenant-General Sir William Stratton 1957–1960
 Lieutenant-General Sir William Pike 1960–1963 
 Lieutenant-General Sir Geoffrey Baker 1963–1966

Vice Chief of the General Staff
 Lieutenant-General Sir Desmond Fitzpatrick 1966–1968
 Lieutenant-General Sir Victor FitzGeorge-Balfour 1968–1970
 Lieutenant-General Sir Cecil Blacker 1970–1973
 Lieutenant-General Sir David Fraser 1973–1975
 Lieutenant-General Sir William Scotter 1975–1978
 Lieutenant-General Sir John Stanier 1978–1980
 Lieutenant-General Sir Thomas Morony 1980–1983
 Lieutenant-General Sir James Glover 1983–1985

References

Senior appointments of the British Army